Ouled Moussa is a town and commune in Boumerdès Province, Algeria. According to the 2008 census it has a population of 40,692.

Notable people

References

Communes of Boumerdès Province
Cities in Algeria
Algeria